Svein Harald Kaasa (16 April 1947 – 29 September 1972) was an international motorcycle speedway rider from Norway who was killed during a race meeting.

Career
Kaasa, a draughtsman by trade won the bronze medal at consecutive Norwegian Championships in 1970 and 1971. He joined the Oxford Rebels team for the 1972 British League season, which was the top tier of speedway in Britain at the time. He struggled to find form and was released at which point he moved to league rivals Glasgow Tigers.

On 29 September 1972 he was riding for Glasgow for the fifth time. In the 11th heat of the meeting at Hampden Park he touched the rear wheel of Martin Ashby, which threw him from his bike and he was then crushed on the safety fence by his bike. He suffered serious head injuries and medical staff attempted to resuscitate him but he died on the track.

There is a memorial made from Norwegian stone at the Glasgow Tigers track in his memory.

See also
 Rider deaths in motorcycle racing

References

1947 births
1972 deaths
Norwegian speedway riders
Glasgow Tigers riders
Oxford Cheetahs riders